Lan is the Mandarin pinyin and Wade–Giles romanization of the Chinese surname written  in simplified Chinese and  in traditional Chinese. It is romanized Lam or Nam in Cantonese.

Lan is listed 131st in the Song dynasty classic text Hundred Family Surnames. , it was the 121st most common surname in China, shared by 1.4 million people.

Notable people surnamed Lan in English contexts
This is a Chinese name, meaning the surname is stated  the given name, though Chinese persons living in Western countries will often put their surname after their given name.

Lan
(Mandarin and Wu Chinese form):
 Lan Bozhou (藍博洲; born 1960), Taiwanese writer
 Lan Caihe (藍采和), one of the Eight Immortals
 Lan Chaoding (藍朝鼎; died 1861), Qing dynasty rebel leader
 Lan Chaozhu (藍朝柱; 1826–1864), Qing dynasty rebel leader, brother of Lan Chaoding
 Lan Cheng-lung (藍正龍; born 1979), Taiwanese actor
 Lan Chengchun (藍成春; died 1864), Taiping Rebellion general
 Lan Dingyuan (藍鼎元; 1680–1733), Qing dynasty governor of Guangzhou
 Jin Sha, born Lan Feilin (蓝菲琳; born 1983), singer and actress
 Lan Gang (藍剛; 1930–1989), Hong Kong detective
 David Lan, or Lan Hong-Tsung (藍鴻震; born 1940), Hong Kong politician
 Lan Jiqing (藍濟卿; 16th century), Ming dynasty official
 Lan Meijin (藍美津; born 1944), Taiwanese politician
 Lan Run (藍潤; 17th century), Qing dynasty official
 Lan Shaobai (藍少白; born 1986), Taiwanese baseball player
 Lan Shaowen (藍少文; born 1988), Taiwanese baseball player
 Lan Tianli (蓝天立; born 1962), Vice-Chairman of Guangxi Autonomous Region
 Lan Tianwei (藍天蔚; 1878–1922), Republic of China revolutionary
 Lan Tianye (蓝天野; born 1927), actor
 Lan Tingzhen (藍廷珍; 1664–1729), Qing dynasty military governor of Taiwan
 Lan Weiwen (蓝蔚雯; died 1857), Qing dynasty diplomat, magistrate of Shanghai
 Lan Wenzheng (藍文徵; 1901–1976), Republic of China historian
 Lan Xingmu (藍星木; born 1949), Taiwanese politician
 Pauline Lan, or Lán Xīnméi (藍心湄; born 1965), Taiwanese actress and singer
 Lan Yan (蓝燕; born 1990), actress
 Lan Ying (藍瑛; 1585–1664), Ming dynasty painter
 Lan Yingying (藍盈瑩; born 1990), actress
 Lan Yinong (蓝亦农; 1919–2008), Communist Party chief of Chongqing and Guizhou
 Lan Yu (藍玉; died 1393), Ming dynasty general
 Lan Yuanmei (藍元枚; 1736–1787), Qing dynasty military governor of Taiwan, grandson of Lan Tingzhen

Lam 
(Cantonese form)
 Yammie Lam, or Lam Kit-ying (藍潔瑛; 1963–2018), famous Hong Kong actress
 Lam Lay Yong (蓝丽蓉; born 1936), Singaporean mathematician
 Lam Pin Min (藍彬明; born 1969), Singaporean doctor and politician
 Lam Sim-fook (藍新福; born 1923), Malaya-born Hong Kong doctor
 Lam Tin (藍天; 1937–1987), Hong Kong actor

Other variants 
 Carmen Nam, or Lán Jiāwèn (藍家汶; born 1993), Hong Kong swimmer
 Jimmy Nah, or Nah Khim See (蓝钦喜; 1968–2008), Singaporean comedian
 Pong Nan, or Nan Yik-Pong (藍奕邦; born 1978), Hong Kong singer
 Ran In-ting (藍蔭鼎; 1903–1979), Taiwanese painter and media executive

References

Chinese-language surnames
Individual Chinese surnames